James R. Stephens (born July 3, 1954) is an American pharmacist and politician from Georgia. Stephens is a Republican member of the Georgia House of Representatives from the 164th District. Stephens has served in the Georgia House of Representatives since 1997.

Early life 
On July 3, 1954, Stephens was born in Lyons, Georgia, U.S.

Education  
In 1978, Stephens earned a Bachelor of Science degree in Pharmacy from Armstrong State & Mercer University.

Career 
In 1978, Stephens became a Pharmacist, until 1998.

In 1992, Stephens became a city council member of Garden City, Georgia, until 1997.

Stephens was elected and sworn in as a Republican member of the Georgia House of Representatives on July 20, 1997.

On November 2, 2004, Stephens won the election unopposed for District 164. On November 6, 2018, as an incumbent, Stephens won the election and continued serving District 164. Stephens defeated Alicia Scott with 52.46% of the votes. On November 3, 2020, as an incumbent, Stephens won the election and continued serving District 164. Stephens defeated Marcus Thompson with 52.56% of the votes.

Stephens is known for the author of 2000 Stephens-Day property tax limit measure, which passed and became effective January 1, 2001.

Personal life 
Stephens' wife is Janice Stephens. They have two children. Stephens and his family live in Garden City, Georgia and currently live in Savannah, Georgia
.

References

External links 
 Ron Stephens at ballotpedia.org
 Ron Stephens at house.ga.gov

|-

|-

1954 births
21st-century American politicians
American pharmacists
Living people
Republican Party members of the Georgia House of Representatives
People from Lyons, Georgia
Pharmacists from Georgia (U.S. state)
Politicians from Savannah, Georgia